Maksim Fyodorovich Terentyev (born 9 August 1992) is a Russian professional football player. He plays for MTsPUFP Mordovia Saransk.

Club career
He made his debut in the Russian Premier League on 10 November 2012 for FC Mordovia Saransk in a game against FC Terek Grozny.

External links

References

1992 births
People from Saransk
Living people
Russian footballers
Association football midfielders
Russian Premier League players
FC Mordovia Saransk players
BFC Daugavpils players
Russian expatriate footballers
Expatriate footballers in Latvia
Sportspeople from Mordovia